Galisteo Dam (National ID # NM00002) is a dam in Santa Fe County, New Mexico.

The earthen dam was constructed in 1970 by the United States Army Corps of Engineers with a height of 164 feet and 2820 feet long at its crest.  Built solely for flood control and sediment impoundment on Galisteo Creek, with its "long history of violent floods", the main line of the Atchison, Topeka and Santa Fe railroad was relocated to accommodate the project.  The dam is owned and operated by the Corps of Engineers.

The reservoir it creates, Galisteo Reservoir, is ordinarily dry.  Its maximum capacity is 152,600 acre-feet.  No water recreation is available.  Although the approximately five-acre site is open to the public for day use, the site is surrounded by private lands and lands of the Kewa Pueblo.

References 

Dams in New Mexico
Reservoirs in New Mexico
United States Army Corps of Engineers dams
Buildings and structures in Santa Fe County, New Mexico
Dams completed in 1970
Dams in the Rio Grande basin
Bodies of water of Santa Fe County, New Mexico
1970 establishments in New Mexico